Újpest-központ (lit. Újpest-Centrum) is the northern terminus of the Budapest Metro  Line 3 (North-South line). It is located beneath a busy intersection, the most important public transport hub in Újpest district.

The station directly serves Újpest and Káposztásmegyer microraions, but the terminus attracts commuters from throughout Rákospalota, Újpalota and the northeastern suburbs. 

The station was initially planned to be a temporary terminus, much like Árpád híd when that station was built, but the line was never extended to Káposztásmegyer and it has been the terminus since opening on 14 December 1990 as part of the extension from Árpád híd.

Connections
 Bus: 25, 30, 30A, 104, 104A, 120, 147, 170, 196, 196A, 204, 220, 230, 270
 Regional bus: 308, 309, 310, 313, 314, 315, 316, 317, 318, 319, 320, 321
 Tram: 12, 14

References

External links
 After Újpest-Központ, end of 3rd line

M3 (Budapest Metro) stations
Railway stations opened in 1990